The Other Side of the Rainbow: The Autobiography of the Voice of Clannad is Máire Brennan's (Moya Brennan) 2001 autobiographical account of her life until 2000. In the book, Brennan gives a details and full account of her life and musical success.

Synopsis

Brennan describes the experiences of growing up in an Irish speaking household and early interests in music through to her success recording with Clannad, Bono and finding her faith with help from her husband.

Reception
The book was well received globally, despite Brennan's worries about several tragedies in her life becoming public. She has done countless television and print interviews in which she described her fears and relief and the "confidence it gave young women". Brennan has since added a new chapter to the book, in which she shares her thoughts on first publishing it.

German print
The book has been published in German, titled Mein Irisches Leben. Die Autobiographie der Sängerin von 'Clannad', Und Schwester von Enya. – My Irish Life. The Autobiography of the Voice of Clannad and Sister of Enya. Brennan has expressed anger with the publishing company in Germany for using Enya's name on the cover. The book was also briefly published in the Netherlands.

References

External links
Official website for the book

Clannad
2001 books
Music autobiographies